Jone may refer to:

Jone (opera), an 1858 opera in four acts by Errico Petrella
Jonê County, a county in Gansu, People's Republic of China
Jone Pinto (born 1991), Brazilian footballer
DJ JoN-E (born 1984), North American South Asian DJ and Radio Jockey